Aruba, officially the Country of Aruba, is a constituent country of the Kingdom of the Netherlands physically located in the mid-south of the Caribbean Sea, about  north of the Venezuela peninsula of Paraguaná  and  northwest of Curaçao. Together with Bonaire and Curaçao, Aruba forms a group referred to as the ABC islands. Collectively, these and the other three Dutch substantial islands in the Caribbean are often called the Dutch Caribbean, of which Aruba has about one-third of the population. In 1986, it became a constituent country within the Kingdom of the Netherlands, and acquired the formal name the Country of Aruba.

Aruba is one of the four countries that form the Kingdom of the Netherlands, along with the Netherlands, Curaçao, and Sint Maarten; the citizens of these countries are all Dutch nationals. Aruba has no administrative subdivisions, but, for census purposes, is divided into eight regions. Its capital is Oranjestad.
	
Unlike much of the Caribbean region, Aruba has a dry climate and an arid, cactus-strewn landscape. The relatively warm and sunny weather, and the climate allow for related tourism activities all year round.

Etymology
The name Aruba most likely came from the Caquetio Oruba which means "Well situated island", seeing as it was the Caquetio who were present on the island when it was first set foot upon by Alonso de Ojeda. Between 1529 and the signing of the Treaty of Westphalia (1648), the name "Isla de Oruba" was used for the island by the Spanish. After the signing, the island was ceded to the Dutch and its name was changed to Aruba.

There were many different names for Aruba used by other Amerindian groups, all of which could have contributed to the present-day name Aruba. Another Caquetio name for the island was Oibubia which means "Guided island". The Taino name for the island was Arubeira. The Kalinago also had two names for the island Ora Oubao which means "Shell island" and Oirubae which means "Companion of Curaçao".

A common misconception is that the name Aruba came from the Spanish Oro hubo which means "There was gold". However the Spanish found no gold on Aruba during the time of their occupation, nicknaming Aruba and the rest of the ABC islands Islas Inútiles, meaning "Useless islands" due to the lack of gold. It was not until much later in 1824 that gold was found on Aruba by Willem Rasmijn, starting the Aruban Gold Rush. Another early Spanish name for Aruba was Isla de Brasil, named as such because of the many Brazilwood trees that grew on the island.

History

Pre-colonial era

There has been a human presence on Aruba from as early as circa 2000 BC. The first identifiable group are the Arawak Caquetío Amerindians who migrated from South America about 1000 AD. Archaeological evidence suggests continuing links between these native Arubans and Amerindian peoples of mainland South America.

Spanish colonization 
The first Europeans to visit Aruba were Amerigo Vespucci and Alonso de Ojeda in 1499, who claimed the island for Spain. Both men described Aruba as an "island of giants", remarking on the comparatively large stature of the native Caquetíos. Vespucci returned to Spain with stocks of cotton and brazilwood from the island and described houses built into the ocean. Vespucci and Ojeda's tales spurred interest in Aruba, and the Spanish began colonising the island. Alonso de Ojeda was appointed the island's first governor in 1508. From 1513 the Spanish began enslaving the Caquetíos, sending many to a life of forced labour in the mines of Hispaniola. The island's low rainfall and arid landscape meant that it was not considered profitable for a slave-based plantation system, so the type of large-scale slavery so common on other Caribbean islands never became established on Aruba.

Early Dutch period

The Netherlands seized Aruba from Spain in 1636 in the course of the Thirty Years' War. Peter Stuyvesant, later appointed to New Amsterdam (New York), was the first Dutch governor. Those Arawak who had survived the depredations of the Spanish were allowed to farm and graze livestock, with the Dutch using the island as a source of meat for their other possessions in the Caribbean. Aruba's proximity to South America resulted in interactions with the cultures of the coastal areas; for example, architectural similarities can be seen between the 19th-century parts of Oranjestad and the nearby Venezuelan city of Coro in Falcón State. Historically, Dutch was not widely spoken on the island outside of colonial administration; its use increased in the late 19th and early 20th centuries. Students on Curaçao, Aruba, and Bonaire were taught predominantly in Spanish until the late 18th century.

During the Napoleonic Wars, the British Empire took control of the island, occupying it between 1806 and 1816, before handing it back to the Dutch as per the terms of the Anglo-Dutch Treaty of 1814. Aruba subsequently became part of the Colony of Curaçao and Dependencies along with Bonaire. During the 19th century, an economy based on gold mining, phosphate production and aloe vera plantations developed, but the island remained a relatively poor backwater.

20th and 21st centuries
The first oil refinery in Aruba was built in 1928 by Royal Dutch Shell. The facility was built just to the west of the capital city, Oranjestad, and was commonly called the Eagle. Immediately following that, another refinery was built by Lago Oil and Transport Company, in an area now known as San Nicolas on the east end of Aruba. The refineries processed crude oil from the vast Venezuelan oil fields, bringing greater prosperity to the island. The refinery on Aruba grew to become one of the largest in the world.

During World War II, the Netherlands was occupied by Nazi Germany. In 1940, the oil facilities in Aruba came under the administration of the Dutch government-in-exile in London, causing them to be attacked by the German navy in 1942.

In August 1947, Aruba formulated its first Staatsreglement (constitution) for Aruba's status aparte as an autonomous state within the Kingdom of the Netherlands, prompted by the efforts of Henny Eman, a noted Aruban politician. By 1954, the Charter of the Kingdom of the Netherlands was established, providing a framework for relations between Aruba and the rest of the Kingdom. That created the Netherlands Antilles, which united all of the Dutch colonies in the Caribbean into one administrative structure. Many Arubans were unhappy with the arrangement, however, as the new polity was perceived as being dominated by Curaçao.

In 1972, at a conference in Suriname, Betico Croes, a politician from Aruba, proposed the creation of a Dutch Commonwealth of four states: Aruba, the Netherlands, Suriname, and the Netherlands Antilles, each to have its own nationality. Backed by his newly created party, the Movimiento Electoral di Pueblo, Croes sought greater autonomy for Aruba, with the long-term goal of independence, adopting the trappings of an independent state in 1976 with the creation of a flag and national anthem. In March 1977, a referendum was held with the support of the United Nations. 82% of the participants voted for complete independence from the Netherlands. Tensions mounted as Croes stepped up the pressure on the Dutch government by organising a general strike in 1977. Croes later met with Dutch Prime Minister Joop den Uyl, with the two sides agreeing to assign the Institute of Social Studies in The Hague to prepare a study for independence, entitled Aruba en Onafhankelijkheid, achtergronden, modaliteiten, en mogelijkheden; een rapport in eerste aanleg (Aruba and independence, backgrounds, modalities, and opportunities; a preliminary report) (1978).

Autonomy 
In March 1983, Aruba reached an official agreement within the Kingdom for its independence, to be developed in a series of steps as the Crown granted increasing autonomy. In August 1985, Aruba drafted a constitution that was unanimously approved. On 1 January 1986, after elections were held for its first parliament, Aruba seceded from the Netherlands Antilles, officially becoming a country of the Kingdom of the Netherlands, with full independence planned for 1996. However, Croes was seriously injured in a traffic accident in 1985, slipping into a coma. He died in 1986, never seeing the enacting of status aparte for Aruba for which he had worked over many years.

After his death, Croes was proclaimed Libertador di Aruba. Croes' successor, Henny Eman, of the Aruban People's Party (AVP), became the first Prime Minister of Aruba. In 1985, Aruba's oil refinery had closed. It had provided Aruba with 30 percent of its real income and 50 percent of government revenue. The significant blow to the economy led to a push for a dramatic increase in tourism, and that sector has expanded to become the island's largest industry. At a convention in The Hague in 1990, at the request of Aruba's Prime Minister Nelson Oduber, the governments of Aruba, the Netherlands, and the Netherlands Antilles postponed indefinitely Aruba's transition to full independence. The article scheduling Aruba's complete independence was rescinded in 1995, although it was decided that the process could be revived after another referendum.

Geography

Aruba is a generally flat, riverless island in the Leeward Antilles island arc of the Lesser Antilles in the southern part of the Caribbean. Aruba has white sandy beaches on the western and southern coasts of the island, relatively sheltered from fierce ocean currents. This is where the bulk of the population live and where most tourist development has occurred. The northern and eastern coasts, lacking this protection, are considerably more battered by the sea and have been left largely untouched. As of 2022, Aruba only has 2.3% of forest-covered land area and only 0.5% of protected natural area.

The Natural Bridge was a large, naturally formed limestone bridge on the island's north shore. It was a popular tourist destination until its collapse in 2005.

Cities and towns

The island, with a population of about 116,600 people (1 January 2019 estimate) does not have major cities. It is divided into six districts. Most of the island's population resides in or around the two major city-like districts of Oranjestad (the capital) and San Nicolaas. Oranjestad and San Nicolaas are both divided into two districts for census purposes only.

The districts are as follows:

 Noord
 Oranjestad (East and West)
 Paradera
 San Nicolaas (North and South)
 Santa Cruz
 Savaneta

Fauna
The isolation of Aruba from the mainland of South America has fostered the evolution of multiple endemic animals. The island provides a habitat for the endemic Aruban Whiptail and Aruba Rattlesnake, as well as an endemic subspecies of Burrowing Owl and Brown-throated Parakeet.

Flora

The flora of Aruba differs from the typical tropical island vegetation. Xeric scrublands are common, with various forms of cacti, thorny shrubs, and evergreens. Aloe vera is also present, its economic importance earning it a place on the coat of arms of Aruba.

Cacti like Melocactus and Opuntia are represented on Aruba by species like Opuntia stricta.
Trees like Caesalpinia coriaria and Vachellia tortuosa are drought tolerant.

Climate and natural hazards

By the Köppen climate classification, Aruba has a hot semi-arid climate (Köppen BSh). Owing to the scarcity of rainfall, the landscape of Aruba is arid.

Aruba is south of the typical latitudes of hurricanes but was affected by two in their early stages in late 2020.

Demographics

In terms of country of birth, the population is estimated to be 66% Aruban, 9.1% Colombian, 4.3% Dutch, 4.1% Dominican, 3.2% Venezuelan, 2.2% Curaçaoan, 1.5% Haitian, 1.2% Surinamese, 1.1% Peruvian, 1.1% Chinese, 6.2% other.

In terms of ethnic composition, the population is estimated to be 75% mestizo, 15% black and 10% other ethnicities. Arawak heritage is stronger on Aruba than on most Caribbean islands; although no full-blooded Aboriginals remain, the features of the islanders clearly indicate their genetic Arawak heritage. Most of the population is descended from Caquetio Indians, African slaves, and Dutch settlers, and to a lesser extent the various other groups that have settled on the island over time, such as the Spanish, Portuguese, English, French, and Sephardic Jews.

Recently, there has been substantial immigration to the island from neighbouring South American and Caribbean nations, attracted by the higher paid jobs. In 2007, new immigration laws were introduced to help control the growth of the population by restricting foreign workers to a maximum of three years residency on the island. Most notable are those from Venezuela, which lies just  to the south.

In 2019, recently arrived Venezuelan refugees were estimated to number around 17,000, accounting for some 15% of the island's population.

Language

Aruba's official languages are Dutch and Papiamento. While Dutch is the sole language for all administration and legal matters, Papiamento is the predominant language used on Aruba. Papiamento is a Portuguese- and Spanish-based creole language, spoken on Aruba, Bonaire, and Curaçao, that also incorporates words from Dutch and various West African languages. English and Spanish are also spoken, their usage having grown due to tourism. Other common languages spoken, based on the size of their community, are Portuguese, Cantonese, French and German.

In recent years, the government of Aruba has shown an increased interest in acknowledging the cultural and historical importance of Papiamento. Although spoken Papiamento is fairly similar among the several Papiamento-speaking islands, there is a big difference in written Papiamento: The orthography differs per island, with Aruba using etymological spelling, and Curaçao and Bonaire a phonetic spelling.

The book Buccaneers of America, first published in 1678, states through eyewitness account that the natives on Aruba spoke Spanish already. Spanish became an important language in the 18th century due to the close economic ties with Spanish colonies in what are now Venezuela and Colombia. Venezuelan TV networks are received on the island, and Aruba also has significant Venezuelan and Colombian communities. Around 13% of the population today speaks Spanish natively. Use of English dates to the early 19th century, when the British took Curaçao, Aruba, and Bonaire. When Dutch rule resumed in 1815, officials already noted wide use of the language.

Aruba has newspapers published in Papiamento: Diario, Bon Dia, Solo di Pueblo, and Awe Mainta; English: Aruba Daily, Aruba Today, and The News; and Dutch: Amigoe. Aruba has 18 radio stations (two AM and 16 FM) and two television stations (Telearuba and Channel 22).

Religion

Roman Catholicism is the dominant religion, practised by about 75% of the population. Various Protestant denominations are also present on the island.

Regions

Aruba is cartographically split into eight for censuses; these regions have no administrative function; some allude to parishes which include a few charitable community facilities:

Government

Along with the Netherlands, Curaçao, and Sint Maarten, Aruba is a constituent country of the Kingdom of the Netherlands, with internal autonomy. Matters such as foreign affairs and defense are handled by the Netherlands. Aruba's politics take place within a framework of a 21-member Staten (Parliament) and an eight-member Cabinet; the Staten's 21 members are elected by direct, popular vote to serve a four-year term. The governor of Aruba is appointed for a six-year term by the monarch, and the prime minister and deputy prime minister are indirectly elected by the Staten for four-year terms.

Aruba was formerly a part of the (now-defunct) Netherlands Antilles; however, it separated from that entity in 1986, gaining its own constitution.

Aruba is designated as a member of the Overseas Countries and Territories (OCT) and is thus officially not a part of the European Union, though Aruba can and does receive support from the European Development Fund.

Politics
The Aruban legal system is based on the Dutch model. In Aruba, legal jurisdiction lies with the Gerecht in Eerste Aanleg (Court of First Instance) on Aruba, the Gemeenschappelijk Hof van Justitie van Aruba, Curaçao, Sint Maarten, en van Bonaire, Sint Eustatius en Saba (Joint Court of Justice of Aruba, Curaçao, Sint Maarten, and of Bonaire, Sint Eustatius and Saba) and the Hoge Raad der Nederlanden (Supreme Court of Justice of the Netherlands). The Korps Politie Aruba (Aruba Police Force) is the island's law enforcement agency and operates district precincts in Oranjestad, Noord, San Nicolaas, and Santa Cruz, where it is headquartered.

Deficit spending has been a staple in Aruba's history, and modestly high inflation has been present as well. By 2006, the government's debt had grown to 1.883 billion Aruban florins. In 2006, the Aruban government changed several tax laws to reduce the deficit. Direct taxes have been converted to indirect taxes as proposed by the IMF.

Foreign relations
Aruba is one of the overseas countries and territories (OCT) of the European Union and maintains economic and cultural relations with the European Union and the United States. Aruba is also a member of several international organizations such as the International Monetary Fund and Interpol.

Military

Defence on Aruba is the responsibility of the Kingdom of the Netherlands. The Dutch Armed Forces  that protect the island include the Navy, Marine Corps, and the Coastguard including a platoon sized national guard.

All forces are stationed at Marines base in Savaneta. Furthermore, in 1999, the U.S. Department of Defense established a Forward Operating Location (FOL) at the airport.

Education
Aruba's educational system is patterned after the Dutch system of education. The government of Aruba finances the public national education system.

Schools are a mixture of public and private, including the International School of Aruba, the Schakel College and mostly the Colegio Arubano.

There are three medical schools, American University School of Medicine Aruba (AUSOMA), Aureus University School of Medicine and Xavier University School of Medicine, as well as its own national university, the University of Aruba.

Economy

The island's economy is dominated by four main industries: tourism, aloe export, petroleum refining, and offshore banking. Aruba has one of the highest standards of living in the Caribbean region. The GDP per capita (PPP) for Aruba was estimated to be $37,500 in 2017. Its main trading partners are Colombia, the United States, Venezuela, and the Netherlands.

The agriculture and manufacturing sectors are fairly minimal. Gold mining was important in the 19th century. Aloe was introduced to Aruba in 1840 but did not become a big export until 1890. Cornelius Eman founded Aruba Aloe Balm, and over time the industry became very important to the economy. At one point, two-thirds of the island was covered in Aloe Vera fields, and Aruba became the largest exporter of aloe in the world. The industry continues today, though on a smaller scale.

Access to biocapacity in Aruba is much lower than world average. In 2016, Aruba had 0.57 global hectares of biocapacity per person within its territory, much less than the world average of 1.6 global hectares per person. In 2016, Aruba used 6.5 global hectares of biocapacity per person - their ecological footprint of consumption. This means they use almost 12 times the biocapacity that Aruba contains. This is the extent of Aruba's biocapacity deficit.

The official exchange rate of the Aruban florin is pegged to the US dollar at 1.80 florins to US$1. This fact, and the majority of tourists being US, means businesses of hotel and resort districts prefer to bank and trade with the consumer in US dollars.

Aruba is a prosperous country. Unemployment is low (although the government has not published statistics since 2013) and per capita income is one of the highest in the Caribbean (approximately $24,087). At the end of 2018, the labor force participation rate was 56.6% for women.

Until the mid-1980s, Aruba's main industry was oil refining. Then the refinery was shut down and the island's economy shifted towards tourism. Currently, Aruba receives about 1,235,673 (2007) guests per year, of which three-quarters are Americans. Tourism is mainly focused on the beaches and the sea. The refinery has been closed and restarted repeatedly during the last decades. In recent years a letter of intent was signed with CITGO (the US subsidiary of the Venezuelan state oil company PDVSA) to explore the possibility of reopening the refinery again.

Until 2009, the Netherlands granted development aid to Aruba. This aid was mainly for law enforcement, education, administrative development, health care and sustainable economic development. This aid was discontinued at Aruba's request in 2009. Since 2015, however, a form of financial supervision has been reintroduced because Aruba's debt has risen sharply to over 80% of GDP.

Aruba also has two free trade zones (Barcadera and Bushiri), where import and export and the movement of services are tax-free.

Tourism

Aruba has a large and well-developed tourism industry, receiving 1,082,000 tourists who stayed overnight in its territory in 2018. About  of the Aruban gross national product is earned through tourism and related activities. Most tourists are from North America, with a market-share of 73.3%, followed by Latin America with 15.2% and Europe with 8.3%. In 2018, there were 40,231 visitors from the Netherlands.

For private aircraft passengers bound for the United States, the United States Department of Homeland Security (DHS), U.S. Customs and Border Protection (CBP) has a full pre-clearance facility since 1 February 2001 when Queen Beatrix Airport expanded. Since 2008, Aruba has been the only island to have this service for private flights.

There are many luxury and lesser luxury hotels, concentrated mainly on the west coast beaches. In Palm Beach are the luxury hotels aimed at American tourists. This area is also called "Highrise-area", because most of the hotels are located in (by Aruban standards) high-rise buildings. Eagle Beach, a short distance from Palm Beach in the direction of Oranjestad, offers hotels on a somewhat smaller and more intimate scale in low-rise buildings, hence the name "lowrise-area".

Oranjestad is the port for the many cruise ships that visit Aruba. The cruise industry is a very important pillar of tourism in Aruba, since during a cruise a large part of the passengers go ashore to visit the island. With 334 cruise calls, Aruba received 815,161 cruise tourists in 2018. The 2017/2018 cruise season brought $102.8 million to Aruba's economy. Oranjestad is also home to several luxury hotels, upscale shopping malls, tourist-oriented shopping streets, and hospitality facilities. The main street, called Caya G.F. (Betico) Croes, has been redesigned in recent years, including new paving, new palm trees and a streetcar line for tourists.

Culture

Aruba has a varied culture. According to the Bureau Burgelijke Stand en Bevolkingsregister (BBSB), in 2005 there were ninety-two different nationalities living on the island. Dutch influence can still be seen, as in the celebration of "Sinterklaas" on 5 and 6 December and other national holidays like 27 April, when in Aruba and the rest of the Kingdom of the Netherlands the King's birthday or "Dia di Rey" (Koningsdag) is celebrated.

On 18 March, Aruba celebrates its National Day. Christmas and New Year's Eve are celebrated with the typical music and songs for gaitas for Christmas and the Dande for New Year, and ayaca, ponche crema, ham, and other typical foods and drinks. On 25 January, Betico Croes' birthday is celebrated. Dia di San Juan is celebrated on 24 June. Besides Christmas, the religious holy days of the Feast of the Ascension and Good Friday are also holidays on the island.

The festival of Carnaval is also an important one in Aruba, as it is in many Caribbean and Latin American countries. Its celebration in Aruba started in the 1950s, influenced by the inhabitants from Venezuela and the nearby islands (Curaçao, St. Vincent, Trinidad, Barbados, St. Maarten, and Anguilla) who came to work for the oil refinery.  Over the years, the Carnival Celebration has changed and now starts from the beginning of January until the Tuesday before Ash Wednesday, with a large parade on the last Sunday of the festivities (the Sunday before Ash Wednesday).

Tourism from the United States has recently increased the visibility of American culture on the island, with such celebrations as Halloween in October and Thanksgiving Day in November.

Architecture 
From the beginning of the colonization of the Netherlands until the beginning of the 20th century, the architecture in the most inhabited areas of Aruba was influenced by the Dutch colonial style and also some Spanish elements from the Catholic missionaries present in Aruba who later settled in Venezuela as well. After the boom of the oil industry and the tourist sector in the 20th century the architectural style of the island incorporated a more American and international influence. In addition, elements of the Art Deco style can still be seen in several buildings in San Nicolas. Therefore, it can be said that the island's architecture is a mixture of Spanish, Dutch, American and Caribbean influences.

Infrastructure

Aruba's Queen Beatrix International Airport is near Oranjestad.

Aruba has four ports: Barcadera, the main cargo port, Paardenbaai, the cruise ship terminal in Oranjestad/Taratata, Commandeurs Baai (Commander's Bay) in Savaneta, and Sint Nicolaas Baai in San Nicolaas. Paardenbaai services all the cruise-ship lines such as Royal Caribbean, Carnival, NCL, Holland America, MSC Cruises, Costa Cruises, P&O Cruises and Disney. Nearly one million tourists enter this port per year. Aruba Ports Authority, owned and operated by the Aruban government, runs these seaports.

Arubus is a government-owned bus company. Its buses operate from 3:30 a.m. until 12:30 a.m., 365 days a year. Private minibuses/people movers service zones such as the Hotel Area, San Nicolaas, Santa Cruz and Noord.

A streetcar service runs on rails on the Mainstreet of Oranjestad.

Utilities
Water- en Energiebedrijf Aruba, N.V. (W.E.B.) produces potable water and power. Average daily consumption in Aruba is about 35600 m3/day., and average power generation is 104 MW. Besides production, WEB also takes care of the water distribution on the island. Elektriciteits Maatschappij Aruba, N.V. (N.V. Elmar) is the sole distributor of electricity on the island of Aruba. N.V. Elmar also offers its customers the opportunity to add solar panel or wind turbines. Together with W.E.B. Aruba N.V., both companies share the same parent holding which is Utilities Aruba N.V.

Waste Management
Sewage plant: there are 3 around the island; Zeewijk, Parkietenbos and Bubali. The one in Bubali (near the bird sanctuary) is 4 decades old and is processing over 8000 m3/day. Around double its original capacity of 4500 m3/day (due to Aruba's growth).

Solid waste landfill: the major one (16 ha) is at Parkietenbos since the 1950. The capacity is between 130 to 150 kilotons per year.  Sometimes there are huge spontaneous combustion creating pollution.

Communications
There are two telecommunications providers: government-based Setar, and privately owned Digicel. Digicel is Setar's competitor in wireless technology using the GSM platform.

Places of interest

Beaches

Notable people
 Dave Benton, Aruban-Estonian musician
 Alfonso Boekhoudt, 4th Governor of Aruba
 Xander Bogaerts, shortstop in MLB
 Betico Croes, political activist
 Denzel Dumfries, footballer (or soccer player) in Aruba, Netherlands national team and FIFA World Cup
 Nydia Ecury, writer
 Henny Eman, first Prime Minister of Aruba
 Mike Eman, 3rd Prime Minister of Aruba
 Bobby Farrell, musician, former and male member of Boney M.
 Frans Figaroa, Lieutenant Governor of Aruba 1979-1982
 Henry Habibe, poet
 Andrew Holleran, novelist 
 Maria Irausquin-Wajcberg, first elected female politician in Aruba
 Olindo Koolman, 2nd Governor of Aruba
 Juan Lampe, musician
 Macuarima, first Aruban Amerindian Chief killed by colonist 
 Calvin Maduro, pitcher in MLB
 Hedwiges Maduro, footballer (or soccer player) in UEFA, La Liga and FIFA World Cup
 Jossy Mansur, editor of the Papiamento language newspaper, Diario
 Diederick Charles Mathew, politician
 John Merryweather (1932–2019), first Minister Plenipotentiary of Aruba
 Nelson Oduber, 2nd Prime Minister of Aruba
 Sarah-Quita Offringa, world champion windsurfer
 Olga Orman, writer and poet
 Sidney Ponson, pitcher in MLB
 Fredis Refunjol, 3rd Governor of Aruba
 Julia Renfro, newspaper editor and photographer
 Jeannette Richardson-Baars, Director of the Police Academy of Aruba
 Xiomara Ruiz-Maduro, Minister for Finance, Economic Affairs & Culture
 Chadwick Tromp, catcher in MLB
 Felipe Tromp, first Governor of Aruba
 Laura Wernet-Paskel, first female political candidate in Aruba
 Evelyn Wever-Croes, 4th Prime Minister of Aruba, first female Prime Minister

See also

 Central Bank of Aruba
 Index of Aruba-related articles
 List of monuments of Aruba
 Military of Aruba
 Outline of Aruba

References

Further reading
Aymer, Paula L. - Uprooted Women: Migrant Domestics in the Caribbean.

Brown, Enid - Suriname and the Netherlands Antilles: An Annotated English-Language Bibliography.

Gerber, Stanford N. - The Family in the Caribbean: Proceedings of the 2nd Conference on the Family in the Caribbean, Aruba, 1969.

Green, Vera M. - Migrants in Aruba: Interethnic Integration.

Hartert, Ernst - On the Birds of the Islands of Aruba, Curaçao, and Bonaire.

External links

 Official website of the government of Aruba

 
Island countries
10th-century establishments in Aruba
1499 establishments in the Spanish Empire
1636 disestablishments in the Spanish Empire
1636 establishments in the Dutch Empire
1799 disestablishments in the Dutch Empire
1799 establishments in the British Empire
1802 disestablishments in the British Empire
1802 establishments in the Dutch Empire
1804 disestablishments in the Dutch Empire
1804 establishments in the British Empire
1816 disestablishments in the British Empire
1816 establishments in the Dutch Empire
1986 disestablishments in the Netherlands Antilles
1986 establishments in Aruba
Caribbean countries of the Kingdom of the Netherlands
Dutch-speaking countries and territories
Former Dutch colonies
Former Spanish colonies
Former British colonies and protectorates in the Americas
Islands of the Netherlands Antilles
Populated places established in the 10th century
Small Island Developing States
Special territories of the European Union
States and territories established in 1986
Dependent territories in the Caribbean